The Fyodorov–Shpagin Model 1922 was an experimental twin barrel Soviet machine gun. It was designed by Vladimir Fyodorov and Georgy Shpagin and was chambered in 6.5×51mm Fyodorov.

References

Machine guns of the Soviet Union
Multi-barrel machine guns
Trial and research firearms of the Soviet Union